Aṉangu Pitjantjatjara Yankunytjatjara, also known as APY, APY Lands or the Lands, is a large, sparsely-populated local government area (LGA) for Aboriginal people, located in the remote north west of South Australia.  Some of the aṉangu (people) of the Western Desert cultural bloc, in particular Pitjantjatjara, Yankunytjatjara and Ngaanyatjarra peoples, inhabit the Lands.

Governance of the area is determined by the Anangu Pitjantjatjara Yankunytjatjara Land Rights Act 1981 (or APYLRA), whereby an elected executive board reports to the Premier of South Australia. The APY administration centre of is located at Umuwa.

A large portion of the APY Lands was formerly the North-West Aboriginal Reserve.

History

Early history
The Pitjantjatjara and Yankunytjatjara people (aṉangu) had lived in this area for many thousands of years. Even after the British began to colonise the Australian continent from 1788 onwards, and the colonisation of South Australia from 1836, the aṉangu remained more or less undisturbed for many more years, apart from very occasional encounters with a variety of European explorers.

20th century
In 1921, with white settlement now beginning to encroach on the aṉangus traditional land, the South Australian Government proclaimed the North-West Aboriginal Reserve. This Reserve consisted of most of what is now known as the APY Lands, with the exception of the eastern part of the APY Lands, which was given over to pastoral leases to Europeans.

In 1937, the Presbyterian Church council, spearheaded by Charles Duguid, established the Ernabella Mission on the Lands at the place now known as Pukatja.

By the 1950s, many aṉangu were living at the Ernabella Mission, while many others lived at camps on pastoral leases on what are now the Lands, or nearby, where they would work. Those pastoral leases included Granite Downs, Everard Park, Victory Downs, De Rose Hill, Kenmore Park, and Mount Cavanagh.

In 1961, to prevent overcrowding at Ernabella Mission, the Church established what became the community of Amata, but which was originally known as Musgrave Park. At the same time the Church also established what is now the community of Kaltjiti, but which was then known as Fregon.

In 1968, what is now the community of Indulkana was established by the South Australian Government, as a base from which to provide welfare services to aṉangu living in camps on pastoral leases, where work was becoming increasingly difficult to find. At that time, the surrounding area was excised from pastoral leases and declared the Indulkana Aboriginal Reserve.

The body now known as Aṉangu Pitjantjatjara Yankunytjatjara was formed in 1981 by the passing of the Anangu Pitjantjatjara Yankunytjatjara Land Rights Act 1981 by the Parliament of South Australia under Premier Don Dunstan, and includes the Pitjantjatjara, Yankunytjatjara and Ngaanyatjarra groups.

"Ara Irititja" is a project of the APY, commenced in 1994 to identify, copy and electronically record historical materials about the Anangu (Pitjantjatjara/Yankunytjatjara people). Its purpose is to prevent the loss of the history, and to allow the teaching of it to others in the community.

21st century

2000s
The peoples of the region have not had any major economic development, apart from tourism, but there have been proposals to mine in the area. The Mintabie opal fields are located in the area, but separate from its administration.

The Musgrave Block in the Lands has been viewed as having billions of dollars in potential mineral deposits and petroleum. But anangu have been wary of opening up the area to mining, concerned about the impact on sacred sites and the environment. Mining companies are conducting discussion to try to allay these worries.

For decades two major issues throughout the Lands have been the low standard of health care (compared to the rest of Australia) and drug abuse, namely alcohol, petrol sniffing, cannabis and later other illicit drugs. Part of the difficulty in reducing alcohol and illicit drug use has been the straddling of the indigenous area by three jurisdictions: South Australia, Western Australia and the Northern Territory. The jurisdictional crossover has made police enforcement of drug trafficking laws difficult, but in 2007 collaboration between these jurisdictions was reported to be delivering results.

In July 2007 South Australia Police in co-operation with liquor outlets in Coober Pedy (250 km to the south-east entrance to the Lands) agreed to create a register of alcohol purchases, to enable police to identify persons who purchased large quantities of alcohol in Coober Pedy potentially for transportation into Aboriginal lands. Also in July, Commonwealth Indigenous Affairs Minister Mal Brough offered federal help for a "drug and alcohol crackdown" in South Australian Aboriginal lands – such as the APY Lands.

In early August 2007, the Rann South Australian Labor Government announced a$ 34 million package to "improve well-being of Aboriginal people" in the APY Lands. $25m was to be spent on improving housing and most of the remaining $8m on law enforcement in Amata and Pukatja. In November, SA Police Commissioner Mal Hyde announced the signing of a new enterprise agreement for South Australia Police that would include incentive packages to lure police to work in rural and remote areas such as the Lands.

UnitingCare Wesley Adelaide (now Uniting Communities) set up a website in 2007 to monitor State and Federal Government spending promises for the APY Lands, tracking the delivery of those promises.

In May 2008, retired Supreme Court judge the Hon E. P. "Ted" Mullighan QC delivered his supplementary report to his Children in State Care Commission of Inquiry, entitled the "Children on Aṉangu Pitjantjatjara Yankunytjatjara Lands Commission of Inquiry – a Report into Sexual Abuse" (aka "the Mullighan report").

2010s

Mintabie changes and closure
In December 2009 the South Australian Parliament passed the Aṉangu Pitjantjatjara Yankunytjatjara Land Rights (Mintabie) Amendment Bill, which was an amendment to the APY Land Rights Act 1981, the Opal Mining Act 1995 and by-laws under the APY Land Rights Act 1981, affecting the mainly non-Indigenous residents of the opal-mining town, Mintabie. This Amendment changed the licensing system for residential and commercial premises effective 1 July 2012, allowing the Minister responsible for the Opal Mining Act to grant licences.

A 2017 report found many instances of non-compliance with the 2009 Amendment as well as other problems occurring in the settlement of Mintabie. It recommended closure of the township, with control reverting to APY. After an appeal by residents failed, the final eviction date for the township was set at 31 December 2019.

Geography and location
The Musgrave Ranges, straddling the border between South Australia and the Northern Territory and the Mann Ranges and Tomkinson Ranges, both in the north-west of South Australia, stretch from east to west on the southern side of the NT border. The APY area includes isolated ranges and hills and large sandhill plains, and APY people also have affiliations with land in the NT to the Petermann Ranges, and in Western Australia.

Geology
There is a large palaeovalley, a geological term for an ancient, buried river, underneath the APY Lands. A map of the geological formation, complete with scientific and technical terminology, has been translated into Pitjantjatjara by a team of translators, based on the English-language map developed by government agencies.

There is a long strip of limestone breaking through red soil near Fregon/Kaltjiti, where a new water source was found in 2019. The area is one of two places in the world which have landlocked tectonic plates, and drilling samples have been estimated to be between 5 and 10 million years old.

Adjoining land
To the north of the APY Lands, the MacDonnell Shire Council was created by the Northern Territory in 2008, renamed MacDonnell Region in 2014, spanning the south of the Territory from west to east. Western Australia lies to the west. The South Australian LGA to the south of APY Lands is Maralinga Tjarutja (with the District Council of Coober Pedy to the east of that, but not adjoining APY).

The Outback Communities Authority is not an LGA, but is the statutory authority responsible for the development of areas adjoining the APY Lands (excluding the above-mentioned) as well as other large areas (63% of the state in total), to "manage the provision of public services and facilities to outback communities" which are widely dispersed across the region.

Localities
The APY LGA encompasses a number of settlements of a range of sizes, many of them being located in the Musgrave Ranges. An interactive map shows the location of communities and further information about each on the Paper Tracker website.

The main communities include Indulkana (Iwantja), Mimili, Kaltjiti, Pukatja, Amata, Pipalyatjara, and Watarru; the larger homelands are Kalka, Kanpi, Nyapari and Yunyarinyi (homeland). The APY administration centre of the Lands is located at Umuwa.

Mintabie was an opal-mining town, leased back to the Government of South Australia between 1981 and 2019, when the residents were evicted.

The full list of Aboriginal communities (c) and homelands (h):

 Amata (c)
 Indulkana (c)
 Irintata (h)
 Iwantja (c)
 Kaljiti/Fregon
 Kalka (h)
 Kanpi (h)
 Mimili (c)
 Murputja (c)
 Nyapari (h)
 Pipalyatjara (c)
 Pukatja/Ernabella (c)
 Tjurma (h)
 Turkey Bore
 Umuwa – administrative centre
 Watarru (c)
 Watinuma
 Yunyarinyi (h)

Governance
Governance of the area is determined by the APY Land Rights Act 1981 (amended 2017), whereby an elected executive board reports to the Premier of South Australia. The board appoints a general manager for a fixed term. Richard King was elected by the board in April 2015, and his term was extended for a year in March 2023, despite opposition by some councillors. 

The statutory functions of the APY body corporate, a land council, are:
 to ascertain the wishes and opinions of traditional owners in relation to the management, use and control of the lands and to seek, where practicable, to give effect to those wishes and opinions;
 to protect the interests of traditional owners in relation to the management, use and control of the lands; and
 to negotiate with persons desiring to use, occupy or gain access to any part of the lands;
 to administer land vested in Aṉangu Pitjantjatjara Yankunytjatjara.

The area is usually referred to as the APY Lands. A permit is required for visitors to any community on the APY Lands, as they are freehold lands owned by the Aboriginal people.

Electoral boundaries
The Anangu Pitjantjatjara Yankunytjatjara Lands Rights (Miscellaneous) Amendment Act 2016 determined the boundaries of seven APY electorates to elect the executive board of Anangu Pitjantjatjara Yankunytjatjara. The electorates would be:
 (i) the community groups of Pipalyatjara and Kalka;
 (ii) the community groups of Kanypi, Nyapari, Angatja and Watarru;
 (iii) the community groups of Amata and Tjurma;
 (iv) the community groups of Kaltjiti, Irintata and Watinuma;
 (v) the community groups of Pukatja, Yunyarinyi, Anilalya and Turkey Bore;
 (vi) the community group of Mimili; and
 (vii) the community groups of Iwantja, Amuruna, Railway Bore, Witjintitja and Wallatinna.

Demographics

2016 census
 General

The 2016 census identified the following statistics:
 APY Lands had 2,276 residents, 52.4% of whom were female and 83.6% of whom were Indigenous Australians (2.8% nationally), Australian Aboriginal ancestry 71.9% (0.5% nationally).
 91.5% of the people were born in Australia (66.7% nationally); 84.9% of people had both parents born in Australia (47.3% nationally).
 There were 511 families.
 Median age of people was 28 years; children 0–14 years, 24.2% of the population; people aged 65+ years old, 5.2% of the population.
 19.2% considered themselves affiliated to the Uniting Church, another 20.2% Christian (3.7%, 2.6% nationally).
 Languages spoken at home were: English only 12.9%; other languages included Pitjantjatjara 65.6%, Yankunytjatjara 3.0%, Western Arrarnta 0.4%, Warlpiri 0.3% and Ngaanyatjarra 0.2%.
 42.9% worked full-time (57.7% nationally) and 25.1% part-time (30.4% nationally).
 91.3% of the population rented their homes (30.9 nationally), paying median rent of $75 ($250 nationally).
 45% of dwellings had no motor vehicle (7.5% nationally).
 35.9% of households accessed the internet from the dwelling (83.2% nationally).

 Largest town populations

 Pukatja (Ernabella) 412
 Amata 455
 Indulkana (Iwantja) 256
 Kaltjiti (Fregon) 220.
 Mimili 283
 Pipalyatjara 189

Historical
The 2006 ABS census figures were not vastly different. The total number of residents was slightly lower, at 2,230, but with a higher percentage born in Australia, at 98%. There were fewer speakers of Pitjantjatjara (58.6%), and more Yankuntjatjara (14.3%). More (46.1%) identified as being affiliated with the Uniting Church, and a similar percentage rented their homes.

Access and facilities

Main Access Road upgrade
The upgrade to the Main Access Road is a major project, originally scheduled to begin in 2015 and be completed in 2019, at a cost of m (split 80/20 between federal and state governments). It is expected to deliver safer road travel, better access to employment opportunities, improved delivery of food supplies, improved living standards, etc. In January 2019 it was reported that construction started in 2017, and should be completed by 2021.

Services
Based in Umuwa, Anangu Pitjantjatjara Services (AP Services), an incorporated body established in 1993, provides essential services such as roads and housing. Regional Anangu Services Aboriginal Corporation (RASAC) was established in early 2010 as an offshoot of AP Services, and is now the biggest employer of APY people, with headquarters in Alice Springs and seven community depots. It delivers services such as rental accommodation, aerodromes, building repairs and maintenance, civil works, community patrols, fuel supplies, homeland services and municipal services.

Housing
A few months after his election in early 2018, Premier Steven Marshall, also responsible for Aboriginal Affairs, visited the APY Lands as part of his "whole-of-government" plan which aims to measure SA's progress on improving services to Aboriginal communities. He reported afterwards that employment, especially for young people, was a major issue that needed addressing; and the other one was housing. His government was working on a new funding agreement for remote housing with the Federal Government, after the 10-year National Partnership Agreement on Remote Housing had ended on 30 June. Susan Tilley, Uniting Communities Aboriginal policy and advocacy manager, said that there were about 75 families still on the waiting list for housing, and that maintenance of existing stock and new housing had to be continued.

Health facilities
The Nganampa Health Council (NHC), an Aboriginal Community-Controlled Health Organisation, runs all of the clinics in the APY Lands and runs a wide range of services, such as the Tjilpi Pampaku Ngura Aged Care facility and health-related programs "including aged care, sexual health, environmental health, health worker training, dental, women's health, male health, children's health, immunisation, eye health and mental health".

In 2014, a Mobile Dialysis Unit, a specially designed truck fitted with three dialysis chairs started operation, visiting remote Aboriginal communities across South Australia, including Pukatja, Mimili, Kaltjiti and Amata in the APY Lands, as well as Marla, Yalata, Coober Pedy, and Leigh Creek. In July 2018, Health Minister Greg Hunt and Ken Wyatt, then Minister for Indigenous Health, announced increased funding for a number of health initiatives, including expanding renal health units in remote parts, through the National Health and Medical Research Council (NHMRC).

In November 2019, a four-bed dialysis clinic was opened in Pukatja, named after Kinyin Mckenzie, who died in Alice Springs while receiving dialysis. The first such clinic in remote South Australia, it was funded mostly by the federal government, but boosted by the sale of paintings by Ernabella Arts, which raised  towards the centre. At full capacity, the clinic can provide dialysis for up to 16 patients, but there is still a need for some short-stay housing to accommodate those who travel from elsewhere for treatment at Pukatja.

Policing
As of 2018, the APY Lands were served by police stations situated at Amata, Ernabella, Mimili, Murputja, Umuwa and the town of Marla. Specialist policing support is located at Umuwa, including CIB and domestic violence investigators.

The station at Umuwa has not been permanently manned.
 a new, permanent policing complex is being built at Umawa. It will accommodate officers with specialist response capabilities, as well provide a base for a mobile unit which will be deployed in Fregon/Kaljiti, Indulkana and Pipalytjara. The service will work closely with child protection service agencies address child abuse and family violence issues.

Water
SA Water operates desalination plants at Indulkana, Mimili, Kaltjiti (Fregon) and Yunyarinyi (Kenmore Park), which treat the water from local bores.

Core drill samples have been dated at 5–10 million years old. Pipes were temporarily capped, but elder Witjiti George said that he hoped the water could be used to support a cattle herd, helping to create jobs and an ongoing industry for isolated communities. The new source could also provide much needed drinking water. APY Lands general manager Richard King said the origin of the water was yet to be established, but the water is pure, with low salinity. Government experts were working with Flinders University and the CSIRO to learn more about the source.

Feral camels
In January 2020, the South Australian government declared that due to the 2019–20 Australian bushfire season and drought, feral camels in large numbers were destroying infrastructure and putting families and communities in danger as they searched for water sources. They were also destroying native vegetation, contaminating water supplies and destroying cultural sites. On 8 January 2020 the South Australian Department for Environment and Water began a five-day cull of the camels, the first mass cull of camels in the area. Professional shooters would kill between 4,000 and 5,000 (or up to 10,000) camels from helicopters, "...in accordance with the highest standards of animal welfare".

Art
The APY is renowned for its artists, who are always well-represented in any exhibitions and awards for Indigenous Australian artists. In 2017, APY artists earned 25 nominations in the prestigious Telstra National Aboriginal & Torres Strait Islander Art Awards; two were named as finalists in the Archibald Prize (which was won by one of them, Vincent Namatjira); 14 APY artists' work made the shortlist for the 2019  Wynne Prize for landscape painting; Peter Mungkuri from Iwantja Arts won the inaugural Hadley's Art Prize; and in 2019, APY artists also won or were shortlisted for the Ramsay Art Prize, the Sir John Sulman Prize, the Hazelhurst Art on Paper Award the John Fries Award, and others. Nici Cumpston, artistic director of Tarnanthi Festival at Art Gallery of South Australia, regularly visits the APY art centres.

APY Art Centre Collective
The APY Art Centre Collective is a group of ten Indigenous-owned and -governed enterprises which supports artists from across the Lands and helps to market their work. The idea was born in 2013, when artists from seven remote art centres got together to look for ways to help the Anangu artists create a network around Australia. However the artists themselves manage the collective. The individual art centres saw collaboration as a natural progression, because "We're telling the same story, and when we work together it makes us stronger"; in addition, exploitation by third parties is reduced.

The collective aims to create and investigate new markets for their work, increase income for each art centre and support their business development, and in addition support collaborative regional projects, such as the renowned Kulata Tjuta project, and the APY Photography initiative. Seven art centres across the Lands support the work of more than 500 Anangu artists, from the oldest one, Ernabella Arts, to Iwantja Arts at Indulkana, whose residents include award-winning Vincent Namatjira. As well as the APY centres, Maruku Arts from Uluru, Tjanpi Desert Weavers based in Alice Springs, and Ara Iritja Aboriginal Corporation bring the number up to ten.

Artist Sally Scales (who was formerly the youngest person to have been chair of the APY Executive Board) has been involved with the Collective since 2017 and is  a regional project coordinator.

The Collective has galleries in Darlinghurst, Sydney, and, since May 2019, a gallery and studio space on Light Square (Wauwi) in Adelaide, known as APY Gallery Adelaide. The Adelaide studio will function as another working space, the first to be established off-Country. An important aspect is that the artists are able to continue working when visiting healthcare facilities or family in Adelaide, with shuttle buses running between the centre and dialysis centre. Nearly 30% of 2019 gallery sales were made by overseas purchasers, and about 50% from the Eastern states of Australia. About 84% of artwork sales ( as of July 2020) has been returned to the communities through the APY Art centres, which are the only source of income in most of these communities apart from the government.

The art centres represented are:

 Tjala Arts (at Amata)
 Ernabella Arts
 Kaltjiti Arts
 Iwantja Arts
 Mimili Maku Arts
 Tjungu Palya (Nyapari)
 Ara Irititja (APY project)
 Maruku Arts (Yulara)
 Tjanpi Desert Weavers
 Umoona Art Centre (Coober Pedy)

In 2019, 17 APY artists were finalists in the Wynne Prize at the Art Gallery of New South Wales.

In early April 2020, the Adelaide gallery had to close to the public, in line with restrictions imposed by the government owing to the COVID-19 pandemic in Australia, so the gallery went online.  In May 2020 it was announced that two of the gallery's resident painters, Sammy Lyons and Leah Brady, were finalists in the Telstra National Aboriginal & Torres Strait Islander Art Awards.

In April 2021, a joint exhibition of the work of Sally Scales and her mother, Josephine Mick, Irititja – Old, Kuwaritja – New, Ngali – Us (a generational story), was opened by prominent Sydney artist Ben Quilty.

See also
 Ngangkari – traditional healers

Notes

Citations

Sources

(See p. 3,7 in the Act.)

Further reading

 (Map showing location and boundaries)
 Aboriginal Lands Joint Standing Committee of South Australian Parliament (2006)

External links
 
 
 
(for latest version)

 
Aboriginal communities in South Australia
Aboriginal land councils
Local government areas of South Australia